Rhachodesmidae is a family of flat-backed millipedes in the order Polydesmida. There are more than 20 genera and at least 80 described species in Rhachodesmidae.

Genera
These 21 genera belong to the family Rhachodesmidae:

 Aceratophallus Carl, 1902
 Acutangulus Attems, 1898
 Ceuthauxus Chamberlin, 1942
 Chromodesmus Loomis, 1977
 Cornalatus Attems, 1931
 Curodesmus Chamberlin, 1922
 Diuncustoma Shelley, 1997
 Dobrodesmus
 Euphallus Chamberlin, 1953
 Metaphallus Chamberlin, 1952
 Mexidesmus Loomis, 1977
 Neoleptodesmus Carl, 1903
 Pararhachistes Pocock, 1909
 Rhachidomorpha De Saussure, 1860
 Rhachodesmus Cook, 1895
 Sakophallus Chamberlin, 1941
 Strongylodesmus De Saussure, 1859
 Tancitares Chamberlin, 1942
 Teinorhachis Loomis, 1961
 Tiphallus Chamberlin, 1952
 Unculabes Causey, 1971

References

Further reading

 
 
 
 

Polydesmida
Millipedes of North America
Millipede families